Chan Foong Hin (Pha̍k-fa-sṳ: Chhìn Fên-kiâm) is a Malaysian politician and chemical engineer who has served as the Deputy Minister of Agriculture and Food Security in the Pakatan Harapan (PH) administration under Prime Minister Anwar Ibrahim and Minister Mohamad Sabu since December 2022 and the Member of Parliament (MP) for Kota Kinabalu since May 2018. He served as Member of the Sabah State Legislative Assembly (MLA) for Sri Tanjong from May 2013 to May 2018. He is a member of the Democratic Action Party (DAP), a component party of the PH coalition.

Election

2018 general election 
In the 2018 election, Democratic Action Party (DAP) fielded Chan to defend the Kota Kinabalu parliamentary seat, facing Joseph Lee Han Kyun from the United Sabah Party (PBS), who was a former DAP candidate. Chan subsequently won with a large majority.

Election results

References

External links 
 

Living people
1978 births
People from Sabah
Malaysian politicians of Chinese descent
Democratic Action Party (Malaysia) politicians
Members of the Dewan Rakyat
Members of the Sabah State Legislative Assembly
21st-century Malaysian politicians